Triangle Pond is a  pond in the Cedarville section of Plymouth, Massachusetts. The pond is located northwest of Great Herring Pond, north of Island Pond, southwest of Little Herring Pond, and east of Long Duck Pond.

External links
Environmental Protection Agency
South Shore Coastal Watersheds - Lake Assessments

Ponds of Plymouth, Massachusetts
Ponds of Massachusetts